Niigata currently sends 12 elected members to the Diet of Japan, 10 to the House of Representatives and 2 to the House of Councillors. The prefecture lost 1 Councillor due to reapportionment in 2019.

House of Representatives 
The current House of Representatives Niigata delegation consists of 6 members of the LDP, 3 members of the CDP and 1 independent politician..

District seats

PR seats

House of Councillors 
The current House of Councillors Niigata delegation consists of 1 member of the CDP and 1 member of the LP. The members are elected from the Niigata at-large district.

References 

Politics of Niigata Prefecture
Parliamentary districts of the Diet of Japan by prefecture
Districts of the House of Representatives (Japan)
Districts of the House of Councillors (Japan)